Marta of the Lowlands is a 1914 American drama film directed by J. Searle Dawley and written by Àngel Guimerà. The film stars Bertha Kalich, Wellington A. Playter, Hal Clarendon, Frank Holland and Lillian Kalich. The film was released on October 5, 1914, by Paramount Pictures.

Plot

Cast 
Bertha Kalich as Marta
Wellington A. Playter as Manelich (as Wellington Playter)
Hal Clarendon as Sebastien 
Frank Holland as Sebastien's Servant
Lillian Kalich as Muri
George Moss as Villager

Preservation status
The film is now considered lost.

References

External links 
 
 The AFI Catalog of Feature Films:..Marta of the Lowlands(Wayback)

1914 films
1910s English-language films
Silent American drama films
1914 drama films
Films based on works by Àngel Guimerà
Films directed by J. Searle Dawley
Paramount Pictures films
American black-and-white films
American silent feature films
Lost American films
1914 lost films
Lost drama films
1910s American films